The girls' slopestyle competition of the snowboarding events at the 2012 Winter Youth Olympics in Innsbruck, Austria, was held January 19, at Kühtai. 28 athletes from 18 different countries took part in this event.

Results

Qualification
The qualification was started on 19 January at 11:00. The nine best snowboarders qualified for the final.

Final
The final was started on 19 January at 12:30.

References 

 

Snowboarding at the 2012 Winter Youth Olympics